Abdullah Yaqta, also known as Abdullah Yaftali (6 May 1914 – 17 July 2003) was Acting Prime Minister of Afghanistan from 11 October to 1 November 1967. He was Minister of Finance from November 1965 to January 1967. He was born in Kabul and later emigrated to the United States, where he died.

References

 Afghanistan. Brief Biographical Directory. Moscow, 2004.

1914 births
2003 deaths
Finance Ministers of Afghanistan
Prime Ministers of Afghanistan
Afghan emigrants to the United States